Gardner is a village in Grundy County, Illinois, United States. The population was 1,463 at the 2010 census.

History
Gardner is named for its founder, Henry C. Gardner.

Geography
Gardner is located at  (41.187881, -88.309524).

Demographics

As of the census of 2000, there were 1,406 people, 558 households, and 392 families residing in the village. The racial makeup of the village was 98.36% White, 0.07% African American, 0.07% Native American, 0.14% Asian, 0.92% from other races, and 0.43% from two or more races. Hispanic or Latino of any race were 3.27% of the population.

There were 558 households, out of which 35.3% had children under the age of 18 living with them, 56.8% were married couples living together, 8.8% had a female householder with no husband present, and 29.7% were non-families. 26.0% of all households were made up of individuals, and 11.5% had someone living alone who was 65 years of age or older. The average household size was 2.52 and the average family size was 3.04.

In the village, the population was spread out, with 26.8% under the age of 18, 7.7% from 18 to 24, 31.2% from 25 to 44, 22.2% from 45 to 64, and 12.1% who were 65 years of age or older. The median age was 34 years. For every 100 females, there were 99.4 males. For every 100 females age 18 and over, there were 95.6 males.

The median income for a household in the village was $42,500, and the median income for a family was $51,827. Males had a median income of $45,288 versus $25,694 for females. The per capita income for the village was $18,995. About 6.0% of families and 6.8% of the population were below the poverty line, including 8.6% of those under age 18 and 2.7% of those age 65 or over.

Gardner hosts an annual celebration on the first weekend in May in conjunction with the Route 66 Red Carpet Corridor. On June 8, 2010, the Rivera Restaurant was destroyed by a fire that broke out in the basement.

Education
Gardner has one grade school and one high school. The high school is known as Gardner-South Wilmington (GSW) High School and is actually the result of three towns combined. Students from the towns of Braceville, East Brooklyn and, South Willmington also attend. GSW competes with Dwight Township High School (Dwight, IL) in several sports including football, track, cross country, and golf.

Notable people
 Lewis M. Long (1878–1938), U.S. Representative from Illinois. He was born in Gardner.
 Robert C. Underwood (1915–1988), Chief Justice of the Illinois Supreme Court, was born in Gardner.

References

Villages in Grundy County, Illinois
Villages in Illinois